Sable Systems develops and manufactures equipment for whole animal respirometry and offers courses in respirometry.

Notes 

Companies based in North Las Vegas, Nevada